Gaff is a surname. Notable people with the surname include:

 Andrew Gaff (born 1992), Australian rules footballer
 Brent Gaff (born 1958), American baseball player
 Jerry G. Gaff (born 20th century), American educational scholar
 John Gaff (1927–2013), British Army officer
 Sheila Gaff (born 1989), German martial artist

Other uses
 Thomas Gaff House (disambiguation)